Andrés Mateus Uribe Villa (born 21 March 1991) is a Colombian professional footballer who plays as a central midfielder for Portuguese club Porto and the Colombia national team.

After coming through the ranks of Envigado's youth academy, Uribe made his professional debut with Argentine third division side Deportivo Español before returning to Envigado in 2012. After a loan to Deportes Tolima in 2015, he joined Atlético Nacional, where he won the Copa Colombia in 2016, and the league title in 2017. Uribe then signed with Liga MX side Club América, where he won an Apertura title, the Copa MX Clausura, and the Campeón de Campeones title. In 2019, he joined Portuguese side Porto and has since won six trophies with the club, two each of the Primeira Liga, Taça de Portugal and Supertaça Cândido de Oliveira.

A full international with Colombia since 2017, he represented the side at the 2018 FIFA World Cup and both the 2019 and 2021 Copa América, achieving a third-place finish in the latter.

Club career

Early career
Born in Medellín, Uribe was formed at Envigado FC. As first-team opportunities were limited, he played a year in the regional league of Antioquia Department, and his first professional games at Deportivo Español in the Primera B Metropolitana, on the third tier of the Argentine football league system. He scored twice in four games during his experience in Buenos Aires. On returning home, he played regularly in the Categoría Primera A for Envigado, Deportes Tolima and Atlético Nacional.

América
On 1 August 2017, Uribe joined Club América of the Mexican Liga MX. He scored 14 goals across all competitions in his first season in Mexico City, including two in a 4–1 win at Pumas UNAM on 3 May 2018 in the Clausura Liguilla quarter-finals. He was named in the 2018 Clausura Best XI.

Porto
Uribe joined Portuguese club FC Porto on 4 August 2019, on a four-year deal for a €10 million fee, earning a net annual salary of €3 million. Nine days later, he made his debut for the Dragons in their UEFA Champions League first qualifying round second leg at home to FC Krasnodar; he came on in the 49th minute for the injured Sérgio Oliveira in a 3–2 loss (3–3 aggregate draw and elimination on away goals). In November, he and teammates Luis Díaz, Agustín Marchesín and Renzo Saravia were suspended from the derby game against Boavista F.C. for having partied the night before; the incident was involunatrily exposed by his wife Cindy Álvarez García on Instagram.

Uribe scored his first goal for Porto – already crowned champions – to open a 2–1 loss at S.C. Braga on 25 July 2020, the last day of the season. However, he was substituted with injury moments later. The following 10 February in a Taça de Portugal semi-final 1–1 draw at the same opponents, after compatriot Díaz had already been sent off, he joined him by headbutting Ricardo Esgaio.

International career
Uribe made his debut for the Colombia national team on 25 January 2017, against Brazil at the Estádio Olímpico Nilton Santos in Rio de Janeiro. He played the full 90 minutes of the 1–0 defeat.

On 4 June 2018, Uribe was named in Colombia's final 23-man squad for the 2018 FIFA World Cup in Russia. He played in three of Colombia's four matches in the tournament, starting the game against Senegal. Uribe hit the crossbar with his penalty during Colombia's 4–3 penalty shootout defeat against England in the round of 16, after the game had finished 1–1 after extra time.

Uribe scored his first international goals on 9 June 2019, two of a 3–0 friendly win away to Peru ahead of his participation in the Copa América tournament in Brazil.

Career statistics

Club

International

Scores and results list Colombia's goal tally first, score column indicates score after each Uribe goal.

Honours
Atlético Nacional
Categoría Primera A: Torneo Apertura 2017
Copa Colombia: 2016

América
Liga MX: Apertura 2018
Copa MX: Clausura 2019
Campeón de Campeones: 2019

Porto
Primeira Liga: 2019–20, 2021–22
Taça de Portugal: 2019–20, 2021–22
Taça da Liga: 2022–23
Supertaça Cândido de Oliveira: 2020, 2022

Individual
CONCACAF Champions League Best XI: 2018
Liga MX Best XI: 2018 Clausura

References

External links

Profile at the FC Porto website

1991 births
Living people
Colombian footballers
Colombian expatriate footballers
Categoría Primera A players
Liga MX players
Primeira Liga players
Deportivo Español footballers
Deportes Tolima footballers
Envigado F.C. players
Atlético Nacional footballers
Club América footballers
FC Porto players
Expatriate footballers in Argentina
Expatriate footballers in Mexico
Expatriate footballers in Portugal
Colombian expatriate sportspeople in Argentina
Colombian expatriate sportspeople in Mexico
Colombian expatriate sportspeople in Portugal
Footballers from Medellín
Association football fullbacks
Association football midfielders
2018 FIFA World Cup players
2019 Copa América players
2021 Copa América players
Colombia international footballers